This is a partial bibliography of American science fiction and fantasy author Roger Zelazny (missing several individual short stories published in collections).

Bibliography

Amber

The Chronicles of Amber comprise two distinct series of five novels and several short stories.

The first five books describe the adventures of Prince Corwin of Amber:

1970 Nine Princes in Amber
1972 The Guns of Avalon
1975 Sign of the Unicorn
1976 The Hand of Oberon
1978 The Courts of Chaos

The second series tells the story of Corwin's son Merlin (Merle), a wizard and computer expert. These volumes are:

1985 Trumps of Doom – Locus Fantasy Award winner, 1986
1986 Blood of Amber – Locus Fantasy Award nominee, 1987
1987 Sign of Chaos – Locus Fantasy Award nominee, 1988
1989 Knight of Shadows
1991 Prince of Chaos

Zelazny also wrote seven short stories set in the Amber multiverse. Here they are listed in Zelazny's intended order, with first publication dates.

2005 "A Secret of Amber" [story fragment co-written with Ed Greenwood between 1977 and 1992, published in Amberzine #12–15]
1985 "Prolog to Trumps of Doom"
1994 "The Salesman's Tale"
1995 "Blue Horse, Dancing Mountains"
1994 "The Shroudling and The Guisel"
1995 "Coming to a Cord"
1996 "Hall of Mirrors"

The latter five of these stories form one tale set after Prince of Chaos, the last novel, so they are latest in Amber history.

All 10 novels have been published in a single omnibus form as The Great Book of Amber and six of the seven short stories were collected in Manna from Heaven. A sex scene deleted from The Guns of Avalon has been published in Collected Stories, volume 3, while the seven Amber short tales appear in volumes 6.

Zelazny collaborated on a companion book, The Visual Guide to Castle Amber (1988), by Zelazny and Neil Randall, illustrated by Todd Cameron Hamilton and James Clouse. The Guide is a reference work providing biographical detail on the Amber characters and a walk-through guide to Castle Amber itself.

John Betancourt has written a series of novels set in the Amber multiverse set several centuries before Nine Princes in Amber.  Betancourt's series tells the story of Corwin's father Oberon, a wizard and shapeshifter. That the Zelazny estate authorized the series has caused some controversy; see The Chronicles of Amber for more details.

An interactive fiction computer game based on Nine Princes in Amber was released by Telarium in 1987. The Amber novels also inspired a unique role-playing game, lacking any random element: Amber Diceless Roleplaying, published by Phage Press.

Other novels and short novels
 This Immortal (1966) (initially serialized in abridged form in 1965 as ...And Call Me Conrad, the author's preferred title) – Hugo Award winner, 1966
 The Dream Master (1966) (an expansion of the novella "He Who Shapes" [1965]); the film Dreamscape began from Zelazny's outline which he based on "He Who Shapes"/The Dream Master, but he was not involved in the film after they bought the outline.)
 Lord of Light (1967) – Nebula Award nominee, 1967; Hugo Award winner, 1968
 Creatures of Light and Darkness (1969)
 Isle of the Dead (1969) – Nebula Award nominee, 1969
 Damnation Alley (1969) (on which a film of the same name was loosely based)
 Jack of Shadows (1971) – Hugo and Locus SF Awards nominee, 1972
 Today We Choose Faces (1973)
 To Die in Italbar (1973) (cameo appearance by Francis Sandow from Isle of the Dead)
 Doorways in the Sand (1976) – Nebula Award nominee, 1975; Hugo Award nominee, 1976
 Bridge of Ashes (1976)
 My Name Is Legion (1976) (considered a fix-up novel in three parts, or a collection of three stories)
 Roadmarks (1979)
 Changeling (1980) – Locus Fantasy Award nominee, 1981
 Madwand (1981) (a sequel to Changeling)
 The Changing Land (1981) – Locus Fantasy Award 1982
 Dilvish, the Damned (1982) (a "fix-up" novel or short story collection that precedes events in The Changing Land)
 Eye of Cat (1982)
 A Dark Traveling (1987)
 Wizard World (1989) (omnibus containing Changeling and Madwand)
 Here There Be Dragons (1992) (written 1968/69 and illustrated by Vaughn Bodē; delayed publication until 1992)
 Way Up High (1992) (written 1968/69 and illustrated by Vaughn Bodē; delayed publication until 1992)
 A Night in the Lonesome October (1993) (illustrated by Gahan Wilson) – Nebula Award nominee, 1994
 The Dead Man's Brother (2009) (mystery/thriller novel completed in 1971, finally published in 2009)

Collaborations
 Deus Irae (1976) (with Philip K. Dick)
 Coils (1982) (with Fred Saberhagen)
 The Black Throne (1990) (with Fred Saberhagen)
 The Mask of Loki (1990) (with Thomas T. Thomas)
 The Millennial Contest series (with Robert Sheckley):
 Bring Me the Head of Prince Charming (1991)
 If at Faust You Don't Succeed (1993)
 A Farce to Be Reckoned With (1995)
 Flare (1992) (with Thomas T. Thomas)
 Wilderness (1994) (with Gerald Hausman)
 Psychoshop (1998) with Alfred Bester  (This novel was completed in 1995 by Zelazny.  Bester's manuscript The Psycho Hockshop stopped mid-sentence on manuscript page 92 (approximately 30–40 pages of the final book), and several pages of manuscript prior to page 92 were also missing.)

Posthumous collaborations
Two books begun by Zelazny were completed by companion and novelist Jane Lindskold after Zelazny's death:
 Donnerjack (1997)
 Lord Demon (1999)

The adventure game Chronomaster (developed by DreamForge Intertainment, published by IntraCorp in 1996) was designed by Zelazny and Jane Lindskold (who also finished it after his death).

Collections
 Four for Tomorrow (1967) (later published in the UK as A Rose for Ecclesiastes)
 The Doors of His Face, The Lamps of His Mouth, and Other Stories (1971)
 The Illustrated Roger Zelazny (1978) (contents of hardcover and paperback differ)
 The Last Defender of Camelot (1980, Pocket Books and SFBC)
 The Last Defender of Camelot (1981, Underwood-Miller) (contains four stories not in the Pocket Books version)
 Alternities #6 (1981) (Special issue devoted entirely to Zelazny, contains rare stories and poems)
 Dilvish, the Damned (1982)
 Unicorn Variations (1983)
 Frost & Fire (1989)
 The Graveyard Heart/Elegy for Angels and Dogs (1992) (with Walter Jon Williams, featuring a sequel to Zelazny's story by Williams)
 Gone to Earth / Author's Choice Monthly #27 (Pulphouse, 1992)
 The Last Defender of Camelot (ibooks, 2002) (Collection has the same name as earlier collection, but different contents.)
 Manna from Heaven (2003)
 The Doors of His Face, The Lamps of His Mouth, and Other Stories (ibooks, 2005) (adds two stories from Four for Tomorrow)
 The Collected Stories of Roger Zelazny (NESFA Press, 2009)
 Volume 1: Threshold
 Volume 2: Power & Light
 Volume 3: This Mortal Mountain
 Volume 4: Last Exit to Babylon
 Volume 5: Nine Black Doves
 Volume 6: The Road to Amber
 The Magic - October 1961-October 1967. Positronic Publishing, 2018.  Ten tales by Roger Zelazny. Selected and introduced by Samuel R. Delany.

Poetry collections
 Poems (1974)
 When Pussywillows Last in the Catyard Bloomed (1980)
 To Spin Is Miracle Cat (1981)
 Hymn to the Sun: An Imitation (1996, assembled by Zelazny but released after his death)
 Collected Stories (contains all of his known poetry including previously unpublished works)

Chapbooks
 Poems (1974)
 The Bells of Shoredan (Underwood-Miller, 1979)
 For a Breath I Tarry (Underwood-Miller, 1980)
 A Rhapsody in Amber (Cheap Street, 1981)
 The Last Defender of Camelot (Underwood-Miller, 1981) (just the story)
 The Bands of Titan / A Freas Sampler / A Dream of Passion (Ad Astra, 1986)
 The Doors of His Face, the Lamps of His Mouth (Pulphouse, 1991)  (just the story; paperback and hardcover editions)
 And the Darkness is Harsh (Pretentious Press, 1994)
 The Last Defender of Camelot (Subterranean, 2003) (Zelazny's story plus George R. R. Martin's teleplay for Twilight Zone)

Anthologies edited by Zelazny
 Thurban 1, issue #3, 1953 (Zelazny was assistant editor; part one of Zelazny's short story "Conditional Benefit" appeared here)
 Senior Scandals (Euclid Senior High, 1955) (co-edited by Zelazny and Carl Yoke)
 Nebula Award Stories Three (Doubleday, 1968)
 Nozdrovia #1, 1968 (co-edited with Richard Patt)
 Forever After (Baen, 1995)
 Warriors of Blood and Dream (AvoNova, 1995)
 Wheel of Fortune (AvoNova, 1995)
 The Williamson Effect (Tor, 1996)

Zelazny was also a contributor to the Wild Cards shared world anthology series (edited by George R. R. Martin), following the exploits of his character Croyd Crenson, the Sleeper.

Zelazny created the Alien Speedway series of novels (Clypsis by Jeffrey Carver, Pitfall and The Web by Thomas Wylde) which appeared between 1986–87.  His own story "Deadboy Donner and the Filstone Cup" appears to have been inspired by the outline that he wrote for Alien Speedway.

Zelazny created and edited a shared world anthology called Forever After.  The frame story uses preludes, written by Roger, to connect the stories.  This shared world involved stories by Robert Asprin, David Drake, Jane Lindskold, and Michael A. Stackpole.  Forever After was published posthumously by Baen Books.

Following Zelazny's death, a tribute anthology entitled Lord of the Fantastic was released in 1998.  This featured stories inspired by Zelazny, and personal recollections by contributors such as Robert Silverberg, Fred Saberhagen, Jennifer Roberson, Walter Jon Williams, Gregory Benford and many others.

In 2017, another tribute anthology entitled Shadows & Reflections: A Roger Zelazny Tribute Anthology was published. This was co-edited by Zelazny's son Trent Zelazny, included an afterword by his daughter Shannon Zelazny and a story by his partner and sometime coauthor Jane Lindskold, and featured a rarely seen story by Zelazny himself.

References

External links
 

Bibliographies by writer
Bibliographies of American writers
Fantasy bibliographies
Science fiction bibliographies